Changuri (also Romanized as Changūrī; also known as Chinguru) is a village in Sojas Rud Rural District, Sojas Rud District, Khodabandeh County, Zanjan Province, Iran. At the 2006 census, its population was 851, in 174 families.

References 

Populated places in Khodabandeh County